Animene Tie is a village in the Kara Region of northern Togo. 
Nearby towns and villages include Dissani (1.4 nm), Koudan-Mangou (5.1 nm), Selebino (4.4 nm), Koutougou (4.7 nm), Kouba Tie (1.4 nm) and Sola (2.0 nm) 
.

References

External links
Satellite map at Maplandia.com

Populated places in Kara Region